The following is a list of notable events and releases of the year 1960 in Norwegian music.

Events

May
 The 8th Bergen International Festival started in Bergen, Norway.

Births

 January
 19 – Anders Vangen, operatic singer (died 2013).
 20 – Nils Henrik Asheim, composer and organist.

 March
 7 – Atle Bakken, composer, keyboardist, and record producer.
 22 – Tore Andersen, country musician (died 2015).
 25 – Ingor Ánte Áilo Gaup, Sami yoiker, actor, and composer.

 April
 28 – Rolf Graf, singer, bass guitarist, composer, and record producer (died 2013).

 May
 20 – Tore Brunborg, jazz saxophonist and composer.

 June
 6 – Frank Hovland, rock bassist and record producer, Program 81/82.
 8 – Terje Gewelt, jazz upright bassist.
 22 – Martin Hagfors, vocalist, guitarist, and songwriter.

 July
 15 – Stig Hvalryg, jazz upright bassist.
 20 – Ole Jacob Hystad, jazz tenor saxophonist and clarinetist.

 August
 23 – Wolfgang Plagge, composer and pianist.

 September
 18 – Nils Petter Molvær, jazz trumpeter, composer, and record producer.

 October 
 1 – Per Bergersen, musician (died 1990).
 26 – Arne Berggren, novelist, children's writer, songwriter and rock musician.

See also
 1960 in Norway
 Music of Norway

References

 
Norwegian music
Norwegian
Music
1960s in Norwegian music